Robert Fujitani (October 15, 1921 – September 6, 2020) was an American comic book artist.

Biography
Fujitani was born in 1921 to an Irish-Japanese family. After studying art in New York City, he drew comics for several small publishers within the city at the beginning of the 1940s. Some of his publishers include Avon, Dell Comics, Harvey Comics, Lev Gleason Publications, and others. He also illustrated magazine articles and was a ghostwriter on several comic series, including Flash Gordon. In the 1960s, he helped create the comic strip Doctor Solar, Man of the Atom. In the 1990s, he illustrated Rip Kirby. In 2005, he received an Inkpot Award at the San Diego Comic-Con.

Fujitani died on September 6, 2020, at the age of 98. He had suffered a stroke in June of that year.

References

1921 births
2020 deaths
American comics artists
People from Cos Cob, Connecticut
Inkpot Award winners
American people of Irish descent
American people of Japanese descent